Will Skudin is a native of Long Beach, NY and a professional surfer. Skudin is a third-generation surfer and along with his brother, Cliff, is the co-founder of Skudin Surf and Surf for All, a nonprofit organization.

Education 
Skudin graduated from Long Beach High School in 2003. Skudin is a long-time friend to Balaram Stack, another professional surfer from Long Beach.

Professional career 
Skudin is currently ranked number 8 in Big Wave Surfing and is on tour with the 2017 Big Wave Tour in the World Surf League.  In 2015, Skudin caught one of the biggest waves ever recorded at Nazare.  In 2013, he was named Eastern Surf Magazine's Surfer of the Year.  He also qualified for Billabong's XXL Ride of the Year.

References 

Year of birth missing (living people)
Living people
American surfers
Big wave surfers
World Surf League surfers
People from Long Beach, New York
Sportspeople from New York (state)
Long Beach High School (New York) alumni